Haddam can refer to:

People
 Abdul Halim Khaddam, former foreign minister, vice president and for a few days interim president of Syria

Places
 Haddam, Iran (disambiguation)
 Haddam, Connecticut, United States
 Haddam, Kansas, United States

See also 
 Little Hadham, Hertfordshire, England
 Much Hadham, Hertfordshire, England